Reppen may refer to:
Else Reppen (1933–2006), Norwegian philanthropist
Reppen, German name for Rzepin, Poland